10208 Germanicus, provisional designation , is a stony Florian asteroid and binary system from the inner regions of the asteroid belt, approximately 3.5 kilometers in diameter.

It was discovered on 30 August 1997, by Italian amateur astronomer Antonio Vagnozzi at the Santa Lucia Stroncone Astronomical Observatory in Stroncone, Italy, and named for ancient Roman general Germanicus. The asteroid's minor-planet moon was discovered in 2007.

Orbit and classification 

Germanicus is a member of the Flora family, one of the largest families of stony asteroids. It orbits the Sun in the inner main-belt at a distance of 1.8–2.7 AU once every 3 years and 4 months (1,221 days). Its orbit has an eccentricity of 0.20 and an inclination of 5° with respect to the ecliptic. It was first observed at Crimea–Nauchnij and Brorfelde Observatory in August 1987, extending the body's observation arc by 10 years prior to its official discovery observation at Stroncone.

Diameter and albedo 

According to the survey carried out by NASA's Wide-field Infrared Survey Explorer with its subsequent NEOWISE mission, Germanicus measures 2.87 and 3.552 kilometers in diameter and its surface has an albedo of 0.36 and 0.267, respectively. The Collaborative Asteroid Lightcurve Link adopts Petr Pravec's revised WISE-data, that is, an albedo of 0.1747 and a diameter of 3.50 kilometers with an absolute magnitude of 14.79.

Lightcurve and satellite 

In August 2007, a rotational lightcurve of Germanicus was obtained from photometric observations by an international group of astronomers. Lightcurve analysis gave a rotation period of 3.1291 hours with a brightness variation of 0.13 magnitude. It was also revealed that Germanicus is orbited by a minor-planet moon every 58.55 hours. The system has a high secondary-to-primary mean-diameter ratio of 0.46. This translates into a satellite diameter of 1.48 kilometers (based on a primary-diameter of 3.23 kilometers).

Naming 

This minor planet was named for the ancient Roman general and poet Germanicus (15 BC – AD 19), who led several successful campaigns into Germania. Germanicus was also the nephew and designated heir of the Roman Emperor Tiberius. As a poet, he wrote "Aratea", an astronomical treatise, which illustrated copy is known as the Leiden Aratea. The approved naming citation was published by the Minor Planet Center on 27 May 2010.

Notes

References

External links 
 Asteroids with Satellites, Robert Johnston, johnstonsarchive.net
 Asteroid Lightcurve Database (LCDB), query form (info )
 Dictionary of Minor Planet Names, Google books
 Asteroids and comets rotation curves, CdR – Observatoire de Genève, Raoul Behrend
 Discovery Circumstances: Numbered Minor Planets (10001)-(15000) – Minor Planet Center
 
 

010208
010208
Discoveries by Antonio Vagnozzi
Named minor planets
010208
19970830
Germanicus